Dogon may refer to:
Dogon people, an ethnic group living in the central plateau region of Mali, in West Africa
Dogon languages, a small, close-knit language family spoken by the Dogon people of Mali
Dogon A.D., an album by saxophonist Julius Hemphill
Musa Dogon Yaro (1945-2008), Nigerian sprinter
Jean-Luc Dogon (born 1967), French football coach and a former player

See also 

Dagon (disambiguation)
Drogon (disambiguation)
Doggone (disambiguation)

Language and nationality disambiguation pages